Charles Belle is a French painter.

Biography 
Belle was born on April 15, 1956, in Rochejean. He studied at the Tunis Institute of Fine Arts and obtained his DNSEP, a high-level art education diploma in 1979. He started hi career as a photographer. Charles Belle’s works has been exhibited at many contemporary art fairs such as Art Basel, Art Basel-Miami, Foire Internationale d'Art Contemporain, Art Brussels, Art Paris, and are regularly exhibited in Paris, Switzerland, New York, Seoul and Beirut.

Selected exhibitions

Solo 
 2021: Regard d’Artiste, Château de Trévarez, Saint-Goazec, France
 2017: Sens figurés, Contemporary Art Center, Nanterre, France
 2009: arbres divers, La Cohue - Vannes Museum of Fine Arts, Vannes, France
 2009: ce doux chemin silencieux, La Cohue - Vannes Museum of Fine Arts, Vannes, France
 2003: Art Paris, Denise Cadé Gallery, New York, USA
 2000: FIAC, Paris, France
 1996: CRAC Alsace, Alsace, France

Group 
 2022: Destins de Cirque, Royal Saltworks at Arc-et-Senans, Doubs, France
 2016: Gallery of the imaginary, Lascaux International Center of Parietal Art, Lascaux, Montignac, France
 2013:Il était une forêt, by Luc Jacquet, Parc André Citroën, Paris, France
 2006: Art Basel Miami Beach, Miami, USA
 2000: Art Brussels, Brussels, Belgium
 From 1994 to 2000: Traveling Exhibition of Contemporary Art as part of the UNESCO Slave Route Project

References 

1956 births
Living people
French artists
French contemporary artists
People from Doubs